This list of notable funerals represents considerable historical funerals, based on both the number of attendants and estimated television audience.

References

Lists of events
Lists of people-related superlatives
History-related lists of superlatives
Death-related lists

Largest things